Lora Hirschberg (born 1963) is an American sound engineer. She has won an Academy Award for Best Sound and has been nominated for another in the same category. She has worked on more than 110 films since 1990. Hirschberg is lesbian.

Selected filmography
Hirschberg has won an Academy Award and has been nominated for another:

Won
 Inception (2010)

Nominated
 The Dark Knight (2008)

References

External links

1963 births
Living people
American audio engineers
Best Sound Mixing Academy Award winners
Best Sound BAFTA Award winners
LGBT people from Ohio
Lesbians
Women audio engineers
People from Olmsted Falls, Ohio
Engineers from Ohio
Re-recording mixers